Colihaut is a parliamentary electoral district in Dominica. It includes the areas of Bioche, Colihaut, and Dublanc in Saint Peter Parish. It came into effect in time for the 1975 Dominican general election. It has been represented by Catherine Daniel of the Dominica Labour Party since the 2014 general election.

Constituency profile 
The constituency was created for the 1975 Dominican general election. It had an electorate of 1,531 . It extends from the sea along the border between Saint Joseph Parish and Saint Peter Parish to Morne Diablotins and then back along the boundary between the parishes to the sea.

Representatives 
This constituency has elected the following members of the House of Assembly of Dominica:

Election results

Elections in the 2010s

References 

Constituencies of Dominica